Gypsochares kukti is a moth of the family Pterophoridae that is found in India (Himalayas).

The ground colour of all wings is coffee brown.

References

Moths described in 1989
Oidaematophorini
Endemic fauna of India
Moths of Asia